Guido Zappa (7 December 1915 – 17 March 2015) was an Italian mathematician and a noted group theorist: his other main research interests were geometry and also the history of mathematics. Zappa was particularly known for some examples of algebraic curves that strongly influenced the ideas of Francesco Severi.

Life and work

Honors 

He was elected ordinary non-resident member of the Accademia Pontaniana on June 16, 1949.
On June 3, 1951, he was elected the corresponding member to the class of mathematical sciences of the Società Nazionale di Scienze Lettere e Arti in Napoli: subsequently, he became an ordinary member (2 June 1951) and ordinary non-resident member (15 December 1953).
On 14 October 1960 he was elected corresponding member of the Accademia Nazionale dei Lincei: he became national member of the same academy on March 21, 1977.

Selected publications 

. "Fundamentals of group theory. First volume" (English translation of the title) is the first part of monograph in group theory dealing extensively with many of its aspects.
. "Fundamentals of group theory. Second volume" (English translation of the title) is the second part of monograph in group theory dealing extensively with many of its aspects.
. This work describes the research activity at the Sapienza University of Rome and at the (at that time newly created) "Istituto Nazionale di Alta Matematica Francesco Severi" from the end of the 1930s to the early 1940s.

See also 

 Algebraic geometry
 Group theory
 Italian school of algebraic geometry
 Francesco Severi
 Zappa-Szép product

Notes

References

Biographical and general references 
. The "Yearbook" of the renowned Italian scientific institution, including an historical sketch of its history, the list of all past and present members as well as a wealth of informations about its academic and scientific activities.
. The "Yearbook 2015" of the Accademia Pontaniana, published by the academy itself and describing its past and present hierarchies and its activities. It also gives some notes on its history, the full list of its members and other useful information.
.
. The biographical and bibliographical entry (updated up to 1976) on Guido Zappa, published under the auspices of the Accademia dei Lincei in a book collecting many profiles of its members living members up to 1976.

. The "Yearbook 2014" of the Società Nazionale di Scienze Lettere e Arti in Napoli, published by the society itself and describing its past and present hierarchies, and its activities. It also reports some notes on its history, the full list of its members and other useful information.

Scientific references 

. Guido Zappa and combinatorial geometry (English translation of the title), a paper from the Atti del Convegno Internazionale di Teoria dei Gruppi e Geometria Combinatoria - Firenze, Ottobre 23–26 1986, in onore di Guido Zappa (Proceedings of the international conference on group theory and combinatorial geometry held in Florence on October 23–26, 1986 in honor of Guido Zappa), describes his contributions to combinatorial geometry.
. Guido Zappa and group theory (English translation of the title), a paper from the Atti del Convegno Internazionale di Teoria dei Gruppi e Geometria Combinatoria - Firenze, Ottobre 23–26 1986, in onore di Guido Zappa (Proceedings of the international conference on group theory and combinatorial geometry held in Florence on October 23–26, 1986 in honor of Guido Zappa), describes his contributions to group theory.
 
. The contributions of Zappa to algebraic geometry (English translation of the title), a paper from the Atti del Convegno Internazionale di Teoria dei Gruppi e Geometria Combinatoria - Firenze, Ottobre 23–26 1986, in onore di Guido Zappa (Proceedings of the international conference on group theory and combinatorial geometry held in Florence on October 23–26, 1986 in honor of Guido Zappa), describes his contributions to algebraic geometry.

External links 

 
 Guido Zappa academic member page at the Accademia delle Scienze di Torino.

1915 births
20th-century Italian mathematicians
20th-century Roman Catholics
21st-century Italian mathematicians
21st-century Roman Catholics
Algebraic geometers
Italian algebraic geometers
Group theorists
Italian historians of mathematics
Members of the Lincean Academy
2015 deaths